Tattle Tale was an American musical group that existed between 1992 and 1995. Composed of Jen Wood and Madigan Shive, they were active in the grrrl pop scene, playing what was later to be termed folk punk.

The Seattle-based group's song "Glass Vase Cello Case" was featured in the 1999 film But I'm A Cheerleader by Jamie Babbit.

Overview
The group was formed by Jen Wood and Madigan Shive in 1992 at the ages of 15 and 17 respectively. They played on numerous compilations before releasing their first single, titled "Early Daze," which was followed by their second single, "Alderwood Mall."

On November 9, 1993 they released a self-titled demo cassette on the record label Kill Rock Stars, and on July 14, 1995 they released an album titled Sew True, which is now out of print.

In 1995, the band broke up, with Wood pursuing a solo career and several collaborative efforts including vocals on 2005 releases by The Postal Service, and Shive fronting the chamber-punk group Bonfire Madigan.

Discography

Albums
 Tell/Yell (1993), Kill Rock Stars - demo album on cassette
 Tattle Tale (1994), Kill Rock Stars - EP / album on cassette
 Sew True (1995), St. Francis - album on CD

Singles
 Early daze (1994), Pillarbox Red Records - 7" EP
 Alderwood Mall / Loose lips (1995), Chou Chou records - 7" single

Contributions to compilation albums
 Julep (1993), Yoyo Recordings – compilation album on vinyl and CD to which Tattle Tale contributed "Fly Away"
 Babble On (1994) - compilation cassette album of bands from the Seattle/Issaquah/Olympia area, to which Tattle Tale contributed "Glass Vase Cello Case" (demo?) and "Arrows"
 Periscope (1994), Yoyo Recordings - compilation album on vinyl and CD to which Tattle Tale contributed "Girls Go To Heaven"
 Move Into The Villa Viillakulla (1996), Villa Villakula Records - compilation album on vinyl and CD to which Tattle Tale contributed "Take 10" and "Erica"

External links

 [ Allmusic for Tattle Tale]
 Jen Wood's Official Site
 Bonfire Madigan's Official Site

All-female punk bands
American folk rock groups
Folk punk groups
Kill Rock Stars
Musical groups established in 1992
Musical groups disestablished in 1995
Riot grrrl bands